The Santi Asoke ( "Peaceful Ashoka") was established by a former television entertainer and songwriter Phra Bodhirak after he "declared independence from the Ecclesiastical Council in 1975".  He had originally ordained within a monastery recognized by the Thai Sangha, but soon left with a small following to form this group, which he sees as a mixture of both Theravada and Mahayana Buddhism.  Described by Donald Swearer as "a radical sectarian movement" that "reflects the forest tradition's ideals of simplicity", the tradition also claimed an early influence from Buddhadasa, which it later rejected.

History
Samana Phothirak was once a bhikkhu of Dhammayuttika Nikaya, but his preceptor refused to take care of him after finding he had repeatedly breached the Buddhist doctrines. Phothirak then resorted to Maha Nikaya at Wat Nong Krathum, Nakhon Pathom Province. As he still repeatedly contravened the doctrines, the community of Thai monks requested the Supreme Sangha Council (SSC) to look into the case. Several inquisitorial panels were set up to investigate the monks' complaints and a decision was made that the SSC should exercise the authority under the Sangha Act, BE 2505 (1962), section 27, to defrock Phothirak. On June 10, 1989, Ariyavangsagatayana, 18th Supreme Patriarch of Thailand and SSC President, commanded Phothirak to leave order within seven days.

Sano Phuangphinyo, Deputy Director General of the Department of Religious Affairs, Ministry of Education, notified Phothirak of the command in person, but Phothirak refused to observe it and declared his secession from the Sangha. He then formed Asoke and established four monasteries: (1) Santi Asoke Monastery at Khet Bang Kapi, Bangkok; (2) Si Asok Monastery at Kantharalak District, Sisaket Province; (3) Sali Asok Monastery at Phaisali District, Nakhon Sawan Province; and (4) Phathomma Asok Monastery at Mueang Nakhon Pathom District, Nakhon Pathom Province. The monasteries consist of temples, pavilions and parsonages as on a par with wats.

The Asoke accepted to perform ordination for those wishing to be Buddhist monks, despite the fact that it was not authorised by the laws or Buddhist disciplines to do so. At that time, more than 100 men and women were ordained by Phothirak. Phothirak also enacted his own disciplines, called "Rules for Asoke Followers." Phothirak followers, whom Phothirak considered as legitimate Buddhist monks and nuns, wore the same robes as the Buddhist monks.

Deputy Director General Phuangphinyo then filed a complaint before the Lat Phrao Metropolitan Police, and the warrants of arrest were issued for Phothirak and his 104 followers. They were arrested on August 8, 1989, and 80 prosecutions were then instituted against them before the Northern Phra Nakhon Municipal Court. The court found that the 1st-79th Defendants (Phothirak followers) were guilty of the religious offenses under the Criminal Code, section 208 (not being a Buddhist monk, but dressing up as a Buddhist monk in order to deceive another into believing that the offender is a Buddhist monk), and sentenced each of them to imprisonment for 3 months. The 80th Defendant (Phothirak himself) was found guilty of aiding in the commission of the said criminal acts on 33 counts, and was sentenced to serve two months on each count consecutively; he was imprisoned for 66 months in total. The judgment was later affirmed by the Court of Appeal and the Supreme Court of Justice. The latter court decided on June 15, 1998, that:

The fact that the 80th Defendant has been ordained as a monk of Thammayutika Nikai Sect...and...later, a monk of Maha Nikai Sect, indicates his agreement to comply with the Sangha Act, BE 2505 (1962), and the regulations of the Supreme Sangha Council. And at that time, the 80th Defendant was capable of observing the said laws, and it did not appear that he was persecuted or otherwise debarred from following the Buddhist disciplines. As the Court has decided that...no legal provision allows a Thai monk to refuse to be subject to the Sangha Act, BE 2505 (1962), the declaration of the 80th Defendant and his followers to secede from the administration of the Supreme Sangha Council and not to observe the said Act therefore brings about a schism amongst the Buddhist Community. Being a priest, that is, an upholder of morals, but refusing to comply with the laws would definitely cause unrest as in this Case.

Asoke later turns to play a part in politics. Phothirak has taken part in several anti-government protests, including that of the Yellow Shirts against Samak Sundaravej in 2008.

See also 

 People's Alliance for Democracy
 Palang Dharma Party

Literature
 Essen, Juliana (2004). Santi Asoke Buddhist Reform Movement: Building Individuals, Community and (Thai) Society, Journal of Buddhist Ethics 11, 1-20
 
 Fuengfusakul, Apinya (1993). Empire of Crystal and Utopian Commune: Two types of contemporary Theravada reform in Thailand. Sojourn 8 (1), 153-183

References

External links
 English-language site
 Marja Leena Heikkilä-Horn
 Thailand's tiny Buddhist 'army'
  http://www.asoke.info/

Theravada Buddhist orders
Buddhism in Thailand
Religious organizations established in 1975
Political advocacy groups in Thailand